HMS Lively was a  torpedo boat destroyer of the British Royal Navy. She was built speculatively by Laird, Son & Company, Birkenhead, pre-empting further orders for vessels of this type, and was bought by the navy in 1901.

Construction
These two ships were four-funneled and were similar to those ordered from Laird's under the 1894–1895 programme (the ), the 1895–1896 programme (the ) and the 1897–1898 programme.

Displacement was  light and  full load. Armament was the standard for the 30-knotters, i.e. a QF 12 pounder 12 cwt ( calibre) gun on a platform on the ship's conning tower (in practice the platform was also used as the ship's bridge), with a secondary armament of five 6-pounder guns, and two 18-inch (450 mm) torpedo tubes.

Lively was laid down as yard number 639 on 20 June 1899, launched on 14 July 1900 and completed in April 1902.

Operational history
She took part in the fleet review held at Spithead on 16 August 1902 for the coronation of King Edward VII, and afterwards served as escort to the royal yacht  during the King's August 1902 cruise along the British Isles. She was back in the instructional flotilla the following month. Lieutenant Ernest Edward Parker was appointed in command on 19 October 1902.

On 30 August 1912 the Admiralty directed all destroyers were to be grouped into classes designated by letters based on contract speed and appearance. "30 knotter" vessels with 4 funnels, were classified by the Admiralty as the B-class, the 3-funnelled, "30 knotters" became the C-class and the 2-funnelled ships the D-class). In February 1913, Lively was part of the 7th Destroyer Flotilla, a patrol flotilla based at Devonport. Lively remained part of the 7th Flotilla on the eve of the First World War in July 1914.

At the outbreak of war, the 7th Flotilla was redeployed to the Humber River for operations off the East coast of Britain. Duties of the Flotilla were to prevent enemy ships from carrying out minelaying or torpedo attacks in the approaches to ports on the East coast, and to prevent raids by enemy ships. On 3 November 1914, Lively  was taking part in a routine patrol off the Norfolk coast near the port of Yarmouth, as was the destroyer , while the torpedo gunboat  was nearby searching for mines. At about 07:00 hr Halcyon spotted several large warships emerging from the early morning mist, which opened fire on Halcyon when she challenged them. The hostile ships were a force of German battlecruisers and cruisers carrying out a raid on Yarmouth. Lively rushed up and laid a smokescreen to protect Halcyon, which despite being the target of heavy fire from the battlecruiser  received only light damage, while Lively and Leopard were unharmed. The Germans retired after firing a few shells in the direction of Yarmouth, and while the two destroyers attempted to pursue the German force, they could not keep pace.

On 8 November 1914, Lively was one of 12 destroyers that were transferred from the 7th Flotilla to reinforce the local defences of the Grand Fleet's base at Scapa Flow in Orkney. She remained at Scapa Flow until March 1918, and was one of the last three destroyers assigned to local defence of Scapa Flow, but by April had transferred to the Irish Sea Flotilla, which by July had acquired the more aggressive name of Irish Sea Hunting Flotilla. On 10 October 1918, a steamer operating as a mailship and ferry between Kingstown (now Dún Laoghaire), Ireland and Holyhead, Anglesey, was torpedoed and sunk by the German submarine . Lively, on patrol off the Skerries, Dublin, responded to the news of Liensters sinking, and along with the destroyers  and  set out to rescue survivors. Lively picked up 127 survivors, while Seal rescued 51 and Mallard 20, but as many as 529 died.

Lively was sold for scrap to Castle of Plymouth on 1 July 1920.

Pennant numbers

Notes

Citations

Bibliography
 
 
 
 
 
 
 
 
 
 
 
 

 

Lively-class destroyers
Ships built on the River Mersey
1900 ships
B-class destroyers (1913)
World War I destroyers of the United Kingdom